Al-Minaa Football Club Academy is the youth system of Al-Minaa Football Club based in Al Maqal, Basra, Iraq. The academy teams play in the Iraqi Youth League, the highest level of youth football in Iraq. The club also competes in the Basra Clubs Youth League. Former player Mohammed Abdul Hussein is the current academy manager.

Al-Minaa Under-19s, previously referred to as the Reserves, is the highest level squad within the setup. They train at the Al-Minaa Training Centre and play the majority of their home games at Al-Fayhaa Stadium in Basra Sports City.

Al-Minaa's Academy is one of Iraq's most successful, winning several championships, including winning the last Iraqi Youth League title in 2022. Numerous international players have graduated from the academy and reserve teams.

Under-19s current squad

Current staff

Head Coaches:

Honours
Iraqi Youth League: 1
2021–22
Basra Clubs Youth League: 2
2009, 2011 
Basra Clubs U16 League: 3
2011, 2015, 2019
Paris World Games, Football U19: 1
2017

Academy graduates
This is a list of former Al-Minaa academy or Al-Minaa 'A' graduates who have gone on to represent their country at full international level. Players who are still at Al-Minaa, or play at another club on loan from Al-Minaa, are highlighted in bold.

  Alaa Abdul-Hussein
  Ammar Abdul-Hussein
  Mohammed Abdul Hussein
  Amer Abdul Wahab
  Hussein Abdul-Wahid
  Ali Abdul Zahra
  Nazar Abdul Zahra
  Sabeeh Abed Ali
  Hamza Adnan
  Abdul Razzaq Ahmed
  Alaa Ahmad
  Hadi Ahmed
  Karim Allawi
  Emad Aoda
  Rahim Bakr
  Nasser Talla Dahilan
  Saeed Easho
  Qais Essa
  Ghazi Fahad
  Hussein Falah
  Nawaf Falah
  Ahmed Farhan
  Mahir Habib
  Abdul Mahdi Hadi
  Jalil Hanoon
  Jamil Hanoon
  Hussein Hashim
  Ali Husni
  Hussam Ibrahim
  Ali Jawad Ismail
  Shaker Ismail
  Safaa Jabbar
  Karim Jafar
  Ahmed Jalal
  Rahim Karim
  Adel Khudhair
  Percy Lynsdale
  Wesam Malik
  Jassim Mohammed
  Karrar Mohammed
  Muslim Mubarak
  Adel Nasser
  Alaa Nayrouz
  Ali Qasim
  Hamza Qasim
  Mohammed Jabbar Rubat
  Abdul Amir Sabri
  Mohammed Nasser Shakroun
  Mohammed Jabbar Shokan
  Oday Taleb
  Faleh Hassan Wasfi

References

External links
Iraqi Youth League

Al-Mina'a SC
1931 establishments in Iraq